Uganda Refinery Holding Company (URHC), is a government of Uganda-owned parastatal company, that is a 100 percent subsidiary of the Uganda National Oil Company, whose purpose is to hold the shareholding in the Uganda Oil Refinery and related infrastructure, that is assigned to the Ugandan government. The company was incorporated as a private limited liability company, under the Companies Act of 2012.

Location
The headquarters of UNOC are located at the 4th Floor, Amber House, 29-33 Kampala Road in Kampala, Uganda's capital and largest city. The coordinates of UNOC headquarters are: 0°18'48.0"N, 32°34'55.0"E (Latitude:0.313333; Longitude:32.581944).

See also
 Uganda National Oil Company
 Uganda National Pipeline Company
 Uganda-Tanzania Crude Oil Pipeline
 Uganda Oil Refinery
 Petroleum Authority of Uganda

References

External links
 The Uganda Refinery Holding Company Limited (URHC) has recruited of its first General Manager

Oil companies of Uganda
National oil and gas companies
Non-renewable resource companies established in 2015
Economy of Uganda
2015 establishments in Uganda
Government-owned companies of Uganda
Energy companies established in 2015